The Boot Boys was a far-right Norwegian Neo-Nazi organization from Bøler, a suburban area of Oslo, with connections to individuals in Bergen and Kristiansand. Consisting of about 50 members, it was considered one of the most violent Neo-Nazi groups in Norway. They were founded in the midst of the 1990s and played an active role for many years. The group was known for having racist and xenophobic views. When the Neo-Nazi community in Bøler was best mobilized in the fall of 2000, it consisted of 10 to 12 young men who were in control of a restricted area. Marches in the streets were being held, while painting swastikas on schools, drinking alcohol and settling down around lake Nøklevann. Daniel de Linde was one of the group's leading members. Other members included Joe Erling Jahr and Ole Nicolai Kvisler, who was later convicted of the murder of Benjamin Hermansen on 26 January 2001.

References

History of Oslo
Neo-Nazi organizations
Neo-Nazism in Norway
Racism in Norway
1990s establishments in Norway